Distemper may refer to:

Illness 
A viral infection
Canine distemper, a disease of dogs
Feline distemper, a disease of cats
Phocine distemper, a disease of seals
A bacterial infection
Equine distemper, or Strangles, a bacterial infection of the horse
Derangement or disturbance of the four humours or "temper", in pre-modern medicine

Other uses 
Distemper (paint), a decorative paint and a historical medium for painting pictures
Distemper (band), a Russian ska punk band
Distemper (album), by The New Christs
Remix dystemper, a remix album by Skinny Puppy

See also
 Murrain, a name of any of a number of serious illnesses among cattle and sheep, for which the name 'Distemper' was used in mid 18th century England.